So Many Nights is The Cat Empire's fourth studio album. On 30 July 2007, the band announced on their website and to their mailing list that the album has been released on 22 September. The release of the album was followed by an Australian tour in September and October. On 14 October, the band broke a record by playing eight shows in seven nights at Sydney's Metro Theatre. The previous record was held by You Am I for seven shows in seven nights at the same venue.

The Cat Empire held a massive launch party at the Prince of Wales in Melbourne on 22 September at midnight to promote the launch of the new album. "No Longer There" was the first single from the album, and was released on 8 September.

On 19 September, the entire album was added to a site for free streaming, three days before its Australian release.

So Many Nights debuted and peaked at number two on the ARIA Albums Chart on 7 October.

Track listing

Personnel 

The Cat Empire core members
 Harry James Angus – vocals, trumpet, guitar
 Will Hull-Brown – drums
 Jamshid Khadiwhala – turntables, chekere, castanets, tambourine
 Ollie McGill – piano, wurlitzer, organ, melodica, backing vocals
 Ryan Monro – double bass, bass guitar, guitar, backing vocals
 Felix Riebl – lead vocals, congas, timbales

The Empire Horns (auxiliary members)
 Kieran Conrau – trombone (tracks 2-3, 6, 8-10,13-14)
 Ross Irwin – trumpet, flugelhorn (tracks 2-3, 6, 8-10,13-14)

String Section
 Su-Ying Aw – viola (tracks 1-2, 4-6, 9, 11)
 Robert John – violin (tracks 1-2, 4-6, 9, 11)
 Mark Zorz – violin (tracks 1-2, 4-6, 9, 11)
 Leah Hooper – cello (tracks 1-2, 4-6, 9, 11)

Additional musicians
 John Porter – guitar (track 2), slide guitar (track 5)

Recording details
 Produced by – John Porter
 Mixing – John Porter
 Engineering – Adam Rhodes
 Assistant engineering – Russel Fawkus
 Overdubs – John Porter
 Studio assistant – Brian (Mad Dog) Gomez
 Mixing – John Porter
 Assistant mixing – Daisy, Colin Suzuki
 Mastered by – Ryan Smith
 Studio – Sing Sing Studios (recording); Morning View Studios (recording); The Dume Room (mixing); Avatar Studios (mixing); Sterling Sound (mastering)

Charts

Certifications

References

2007 albums
The Cat Empire albums